Rugby High School is a selective grammar school situated in the Bilton area of Rugby, Warwickshire, England. The school motto is “She Sets Heights In Her Heart”. It takes girls aged 11–18 and boys 16–18. To attend this school, all students must have scored highly in the Eleven plus exam. It is the only state school in Warwickshire to offer Latin as a subject. In January of 2023, it was rated "Good" by Ofsted.

Admissions
To be accepted into the school, pupils must currently take the Eleven plus exam. Candidates who live in Rugby must come in the top 120 girls and candidates who live in the wider catchment area (10 miles from the rugby water tower) must come within the top 60.

It caters purely for female students from Year 7 – 13 and as of the start of the 2018 Academic Year takes boys Year 12 – 13. This was in response to competing school Lawrence Sheriff accepting both male and female students into their sixth form.

In the 11–16 age range, the school has a four-form intake. Each year group numbers roughly 120 girls. At post 16, pupils from many other schools join the current pupils at Rugby High School to create a year group that is around double the size of 11–16 year groups.

History

Olive Hands
Olive Hands was born in Rugby. After attending the University of London, she became a teacher at a school in Bromyard. She decided, at the age of 27, that girls of Rugby should be given the opportunity for a first class education. She borrowed money to set up a private school in 1903 in adjoining houses at 10 and 12 Elsee Road. It was named the Arnold High School. Later a preparatory department for younger girls was opened and this had 50 pupils by 1910. By 1909 the school had been expanded by linking it to 12 Elsee Road and there were a total of 114 pupils. By 1914 the preparatory department had moved to Eastfield House (now the Masonic Hall ). In 1916 there were 91 pupils in each half of the school.

The County School
The 1918 Education Act gave the county council responsibility for secondary education. In 1919 the W.C.C. was in the process of buying the Clifton Road site when Miss Hands decided she had to close her school. This was the only girls school in Rugby with moderate fees so the council decided it had to take over. In 1919 Miss M.M. Skues was appointed as the first council headmistress. There were 195 girls on the roll and the Elsee Road houses could hold 130. In 1921 the Clifton Road site came into use as the school playing field, replacing a rented field in Bilton Road. In 1926 Miss Skues retired and Miss Glenday took over 140 pupils in the upper school and 40 in the lower.

Rugby High School for Girls – Clifton Road
The foundation stone was laid on 2 October 1924 and the upper school moved in for the Autumn term 1927, when 'Arnold' was dropped from the name. At this point only the main assembly hall and the East quadrangle had been built and was not really large enough for the 168 girls using it. Building of the West quadrangle did not start until 1931 and was finished for September 1932. There was now room for the Preparatory department to move to the new site from Eastfield House. When Miss Glenday left  to join Clifton High School, Bristol in 1933 there were 300 pupils and 19 teachers at Clifton Road. The new headmistress was Miss Briselden. In 1944 the Education Act prompted the closing of the Preparatory Department. There was no 5 year old entry that year and in 1949 the last year of girls reached 11. The spare space let the upper school increase its intake to 3 forms per year from 1944. In 1955 Miss D.M. Lindsley became headmistress and a month later it was announced that the school was going to move sites again. The Technical College was being split to form an Engineering College and a College of Further Education. The latter college was to take over the school buildings. The High School moved to its present buildings in Longrood Road, Bilton in September 1960.

Houses 

The school introduced a house system during the academic year 2000–2001. The current houses are named after Onjali Raúf, founder of Making Herstory and an author, Dame Kelly Holmes, an athlete, Mary Seacole, a British-Jamaican Nurse and Evelyn Glennie, a deaf percussionist – the initials of which stand for RHSG (Rugby High School for Girls). These names were changed in September 2021 with the previous house names coming from Sue Ryder, Barbara Hepworth, Helen Sharman and Evelyn Glennie.  Initially there were only three houses with the initials RHS after the shortened for of Rugby High School but from September 2016 a fourth house was introduced named after Evelyn Glennie, an inspirational woman who was voted for by students.  The initial of 'G' stands for the 'Girls' in 'Rugby High School for Girls'. The houses are assigned to whole form groups, and they can gain house points by taking part in various school events, such as the annual Sports Day, interform sports, or Pink Day (in support of Cancer Research UK). Each form is given the initial of their house, to come before the initial of their form tutor, e.g. 8R, is a Year 8 form, in Raúf House. The system is not very different from the interform system previously in place, with students in the same form all being placed within the same house. However, the house system has created a link between different year groups and has encouraged wider participation in school events other than the interform.

The original houses, in use at least up to 1979, were named after Katharine Stewart-Murray, Duchess of Atholl, Charlotte Brontë/Emily Brontë/Anne Brontë, Edith Cavell, Marie Curie, Florence Nightingale and Queen Margaret. These were all named after strong women.   Each form had some members of each house. There were inter-house sports competitions and a music competition. House points were awarded for consistently good work in a particular subject – three A's in a row as well as mentions on a termly sheet. These could be negative (unsatisfactory) as well as several grades of positive. The points were totalled and a shield awarded.

The school also has a 6th Form Entertainment, produced by the year 13 students – sometimes with assistance from the staff – at the end of the Autumn term. This tradition was suspended for several years after a script was deemed to be offensive to members of the staff. It was resurrected in The academic year 2004–2005, with greater involvement and participation from the staff. The new format the entertainment took was of a variety show, with music and dancing displays, followed by a panto-like skit. The skit is often based around a famous story or event, but with students playing the roles of teachers. Previous years included Cinderella (1999), Big Brother (2000), The Wizard of Oz (2001) and The Sound of Music (2005). Each Christmas, there is also a Decorated Classrooms competition, where students take a theme and decorate their classrooms, often acting out performances while being judged.

Uniform
The school uniform was changed in September 2011. The previous uniform was, for years 7–9, a pale blue polo shirt with a navy blue sweatshirt and navy blue trousers/skirt, for years 10–11 a white or pale blue shirt with a navy blue V-Neck jumper and navy blue trousers/skirt and for Sixth form, office dress.

The new uniform consists of a navy blue blazer with navy blue trousers/skirt and navy blue V-neck jumper or tank top. Years 7–9 should wear a pale blue shirt and years 10–11 should wear a white shirt with blue stripes.

From September 2013, there will be a new sixth form uniform. Students should wear matching trousers/skirt with a matching jacket in a suit style with any smart shirt of their choice.

Also, after Summer 2016, there will be a new PE- Kit consisting of blue and House colours. Raúf is yellow, Holmes is Red, Seacole is Green and Glennie is Purple

From September 2017, there is a change to the blazers, changing the crest from the previous logo (RHS in a circle) to the new one (a lime green 'R' with Rugby High School Written below in white). These new blazers are 'Eco' blazers made from recycled plastic bottles

Old Girls' Society
The Old Girls’ Society was formed in October 1922.  In addition to the summer reunions, there was a flourishing Old Girls Dramatic Society, and a Hockey Club.  For several years, an Old Girls’ Dance was held at Christmas time but support for these events eventually dwindled and so from 1959 until 1963, the Society ceased to exist.  When it was revived in 1963, Cheese and Wine parties, theatre parties and Coffee evenings were organized to attract members, for many members of the Old Girls lived in Rugby. Each year, money was raised for charities including the Margery Fry Trust for ex-prisoners, Lifeline, Multiple Sclerosis Society, Schizophrenia Society, the Hoskyn Centre and other charities.

The Society presented a music stool and engraved outdoor seat to mark the occasion of the Diamond Jubilee of the school in 1979.  Church services have taken place on the special anniversaries of the school and trees have been planted at the school.  Funds were raised by the Old Girls to buy a table and chair for the platform in the School Hall in memory of Miss Briselden (a former Headmistress) after her death in 1992.  The Society also raised funds towards the £2000 needed to help provide furnishings and musical equipment for the Alexander Youngman Music Centre.

Shirley Wallbank has provided musical entertainment for the reunion on several occasions and Pat Petrie wrote a play portraying her schooldays (1949–1954).  There was no shortage of Old Girls then to dress up in the navy tunics, square-necked blouses and the pudding basin hats that they hated when at school!

The biggest Fund raising was to restore the tiled Art Deco panel which had been rescued from the Clifton Road school just before it was demolished in 1995. The panel showing Joan of Arc can now be found on the foyer wall at the Rugby Library.

At present, the Society meets for the annual reunion in May at Rugby High School.

Notable former pupils

 Laura Bettinson, singer-songwrier
 Emily Burns, singer
 Karen Leeder, Professor of Modern German Literature at the University of Oxford
 Karen Lumley (nee Allott), Conservative MP since 2010 for Redditch (beating Jacqui Smith, the former Labour Home Secretary)
 Kate Radley, former keyboard player of Spiritualized, and former girlfriend of Jason Pierce of Spacemen 3, and wife since 1995 of Richard Ashcroft
 Dame Fiona Reynolds, Master since October 2012 of Emmanuel College, Cambridge, and former Chief Executive from 2001 until 2012 of the National Trust
 Dame Barbara Stocking (former Head Girl), former Chief Executive from May 2001 until February 2013 of Oxfam GB, and President since 2013 of Murray Edwards College, Cambridge
 Vikki Stone Composer and Comedian.

References

External links
 Rugby High School website
 EduBase

Girls' schools in Warwickshire
Grammar schools in Warwickshire
Schools in Rugby, Warwickshire
Educational institutions established in 1928
1928 establishments in England
Academies in Warwickshire